Roger R. Ream (born November 12, 1954 in Neenah, Wisconsin, United States) is the president of The Fund for American Studies (TFAS). The mission of TFAS is "to change the world by developing leaders for a free society."

Education 
Ream received his bachelor's degree from Vanderbilt University in 1977.  He also did graduate work in economics at George Mason University.

While at Vanderbilt, Ream received a Barry M. Goldwater Scholarship to attend The Fund for American Studies Institute on Political and Economic Systems at Georgetown University in Washington, D.C. during the summer of 1976.  He was named John and Virginia Engalitcheff Outstanding Young American at the program.  During the summer he interned for Congressman Philip M. Crane (R-Ill).

Early career 
Upon graduation from college, Ream returned to Washington to work for the American Conservative Union, then opening up the campaign operations for the Phil Crane for President committee in 1978. He left there to join the senior staff and serve as director of seminars at the Foundation for Economic Education in Irvington, N.Y.  Returning to Washington in 1982, Ream joined the staff of Rep. Ron Paul (Tex), handling tax and budget policy issues.  In 1984, Ream helped found and served as vice president for development at Citizens for a Sound Economy, an economic policy organization in Washington, D.C.

The Fund for American Studies 
In 1991, he joined The Fund for American Studies as executive vice president and was named president and chief operating officer in 1998.

Ream was a founding member of the Frank S. Meyer Society and currently serves as its secretary. He serves as the Chairman of the Board of the Foundation for Economic Education. He is also a board member of the U.S. Air Force Academy Foundation, and the International Freedom Educational Foundation. He is a past president of the Philadelphia Society and a member of the advisory boards of America's Future Foundation and Talent Market.

Personal life 
Ream was born to Rev. Norman S. Ream and Muriel Ream on November 12, 1954, in Neenah, Wisconsin.  He grew up just outside Milwaukee, Wisconsin, in the suburb of Wauwatosa. He and his wife Mary Kay have three daughters.

References

External links 
 Roger Ream Biography
 

People from Neenah, Wisconsin
People from Wauwatosa, Wisconsin
Writers from Wisconsin
Vanderbilt University alumni
1954 births
Living people